Prospero Nale Arellano (January 17, 1937 – February 1, 2014) was a Filipino Roman Catholic bishop.

Ordained to the priesthood in 1963, Arellano was appointed bishop of the Roman Catholic Diocese of Libmanan, Philippines in 1989 and resigned in 2008.

References

1937 births
2014 deaths
21st-century Roman Catholic bishops in the Philippines
20th-century Roman Catholic bishops in the Philippines